Little Italy is an unincorporated community in Randolph County, West Virginia, United States.

A large share of the early settlers being natives of Italy caused the name to be selected.

References

Italian-American culture in West Virginia
Little Italys in the United States
Unincorporated communities in Randolph County, West Virginia
Unincorporated communities in West Virginia